Metropolitan Learning Center may refer to either of two public schools in the United States:

Metropolitan Learning Center (Bloomfield, Connecticut)
Metropolitan Learning Center (Portland, Oregon)